The M194 is a straight-six engine produced by Daimler-Benz in limited numbers for its 1952 W194 300SL racer.

Design 
The M194 is based on the M186 engine from the then-new W186 300. It is a four-stroke engine with three Solex carburetors and two valves per cylinder. The engine is titled 50 degrees to the left in order to reduce the height of the hood, and uses a dry sump lubrication system instead of an oil pan and reservoir. It is also mounted behind the front axle for better weight distribution.

Models 

Application:
 1952 W194 300SL

See also
 List of Mercedes-Benz engines

References 

Mercedes-Benz engines
Straight-six engines
Gasoline engines by model